Djurgårdens IF Handbollsförening (commonly known as Djurgården  or informally Djurgår'n ; abbreviated DIF is the handball section of Djurgårdens IF.

History
Djurgårdens IF started its handball section in the 1934–35 season. In the 1938, they were in Swedish championship final against Västerås IK. The team played in top-tier Allsvenskan between 1939 and 1941.

The team folded once and restarted in 1990. In 2002, Djurgården merged with Elitserien team BK Söder and the new team competed in Elitserien as Djurgårdens IF.

In 2013, the senior team of Djurgårdens IF folded again. A new team started and plays in Division 5.

Djurgården plays in Division 1 Norra 2017–18 season.

Kits

Honours
 Swedish Champions:
 Runners-up (1): 1938

References

External links
 
 

Djurgårdens IF
Swedish handball clubs
Handball clubs established in 1934
1934 establishments in Sweden